Mordellistena guatemalensis is a beetle in the genus Mordellistena of the family Mordellidae. It was described in 1944 by Ray.

References

guatemalensis
Beetles described in 1944